Darya Yurievna Moroz (born 1 September 1983) is a Soviet and Russian film and stage actress, Honored Artist of Russia (2015). She is a two-time winner of the Nika Award (2009, 2015). She is best known for starring in the TV series Gold Diggers.

Biography
Darya Moroz was born in Leningrad, Russian SFSR, Soviet Union (now Saint Petersburg, Russia). Darya grew up in a family of actors, she started acting at an early age. She made her debut at the age of three months in the movie Dear, Dearest, Beloved, Unique.... As a child, Darya engaged in artistic gymnastics, but the coach did not see in her talent gymnasts. Then there was a period of training in figure skating, and Darya even ranked second in the same competition. There were other children's interests: animation studio, painting, theatrical studio.

In the years of study at the school Daria continued to act in films, starring in five films:  The Family Man, Black Square,  Russian Ragtime. After listening to them, Daria wanted to change caused during his school years, the decision to enroll in college theater and acting at MGIMO.

By this time Georgy Daneliya invited her on a first major role in the comedy  Fortune. It was on the set of this picture Darya was determined to become an actress. For the film  Fortune  Darya was awarded a special mention of the jury of the festival Kinotavr 2000.

Darya Moroz entered the Moscow Art Theatre School, in the course of Roman Kozak and Dmitry Brusnikin. In 2003, she graduated and was accepted into the troupe of the Chekhov Moscow Art Theatre.

In 2005, she graduated from producer faculty of Higher Courses for Scriptwriters and Directors (workshop of Vladilen Arsenyev).

In 2009 she participated in the music program Two Stars on Channel One paired with Pelageya.

Personal life
First husband   Andrei  Tomashevsky (born April 20, 1972), director. They parted because of Andrei's unwillingness to have children.
Second husband   Konstantin  Bogomolov (born July 23, 1975), Russian theater director, poet. Darya and Konstantin met in 2009, when Bogomolov invited her to play the role of the rich young widow Eulampia Kupavina in his play Wolves and Sheep  based on the play of the same name by Alexander Ostrovsky in  Tabakerka  Theater. Darya was then married. The marriage was registered on May 11, 2010. On August 18, 2018, they divorced, remaining on good terms.
Daughter   Anna  Bogomolova (born September 6, 2010),  studies at a German school at the Embassy of Germany in Russia, located in Moscow, as well as at a children's music school, plays tennis.

Filmography

1984 Dear, Dearest, Beloved, Unique... as Gerochka
1991 The Family Man as Kolyvanov's daughter 
1992 Black Square as Luda Merkulova
1993 Russian Ragtime as Mitya's Mitya's daughter 
2000 Fortune as Masha Sorokina, bride
2000 Athens Evenings as Natasha
2001 Savage as Varya
2001 Salome (TV Series) as Katerina Bronina, Salome's sister  
2002 Women's Logic (TV Movie) as Vika Korzun
2002 Kamenskaya 2 (TV Series) as Vika Ulanova
2003 Blues Theater (TV Series) as Anna Astakhova
2004 Women in A Game Without Rules (TV Mini-Series) as Masha Peredreeva
2004 Farewell Echo (TV Series) as Oksana Perfilieva
2005 The Fall of the Empire (TV Series) as  Katya
2005 Multiplying Grieve (TV Mini-Series) as Lena Ostroumova
2006 Point as Nina 
2006 Nankin Landscape as Nadya, Zhen-zi 
2008 Live and Remember as Nastya
2008 Thaw as Natasha
2008 The Apostle (TV Mini-Series) as Lida
2008 Brothers detectives (TV Series) as Katya Mukhina
2008 Frenchman Serge as Irina
2009 Pelagia and the White Bulldog (TV Series) as Governor's wife  Lyudmila Platonovna 
2009 Jumping Bottlenose Dolphin as Maya
2009 Two Ladies in Amsterdam as Svetlana
2009 Trap (TV Mini-Series) as Vera
2010 The House of the Sun as Gerda
2010 French Doctor (TV Series) as Larissa
2011 Dostoevsky (TV Series) as Sasha Schubert, actress
2011 Black Wolves (TV Series) as Vera Samarina
2011 The Forgotten (TV Mini-Series) as Anya
2011 Do Not Cry for Me, Argentina (TV Series) as Alla
2011 'Cedar'  Pierces the Sky (TV Series) as Alla Kantorovich
2011 Fairytale.Is as Barbie
2012 Conductor as Olga
2012 No Witnesses (TV Series) as Lena
2012 Steel Butterfly as Tatiana
2012 Kraplyony (TV Series) as Veronika
2014 Department (TV Series) as Alena Ivanovna Revnivtseva, lawyer
2014  House with Lilies (TV Series) as Taisia 
2014 The Long Way Home (TV Series) as Nadya
2014 Inquisitor (TV Series) as Kira Eduardovna Falk, department press secretary
2014 The Fool as Masha
2014 Hold Me (TV) as Maria Ozerova
2015 The Dawns Here Are Quiet as Maria, apartment proprietress
2015 Santa Mazaev and Zaitsev (TV Mini-Series) as Rita Zaitseva
2015 Pioneers-heroes as Katya Eliseeva
2016 Graphomaniac as Veronika
2016 Crime (TV Series) as Sasha Moskvina
2016 Collector as Ksenia (voice)
2016 When the Stars Collide as Raisa Gorbacheva
2017 Red Bracelets (TV Series) as Alyona
2019 Gold Diggers as Lena Shirokova
2023 Mira as Svetlana

References

External links 
 
 
 Дарья Мороз on Facebook

1983 births
Living people
Soviet actresses
Soviet child actresses
Russian child actresses
Russian film actresses
Russian television actresses
Russian stage actresses
20th-century Russian actresses
21st-century Russian actresses
Honored Artists of the Russian Federation
Recipients of the Nika Award
Moscow Art Theatre School alumni
Actresses from Saint Petersburg